Stonebridge Park is a London Overground and London Underground station in Tokyngton and Stonebridge, north-west London.  It is on both the London Overground Watford DC line and London Underground Bakerloo line. It is located on Argenta Way, and is named after the nearby junction connecting the North Circular Road (A406) with the Harrow Road (A404).

History

The line serving the station was opened by the London and North Western Railway as part of their "New Line" project on 15 June 1912. It closed on 9 January 1917 and reopened for Bakerloo line trains on 1 August 1917. One of the generating stations supplying this network was on the site of the current London Underground depot north west of the station. The carriage shed, now without direct connection to the DC line, between Stonebridge Park station and Stonebridge Park LU depot was originally built to house LNWR stock using the DC line.

The current station platforms and associated buildings were first built by the London, Midland and Scottish Railway in 1948 to a design attributed to John Weeks following destruction of the original structures by bombing in World War II, the booking hall at ground level appears to be the original building. The platform-level style of the rebuilding was different from that of the original DC line stations (but not the same as the 1938 South Kenton station on the same line), utilising concrete and steel rather than brick buildings with wood and glass canopies. The 1948 buildings have themselves suffered two major fires which resulted in the rebuilding of the up side platform buildings and later the partial demolition of the down side platform building. Later upgrading and improvement of the platform structures has retained the basic 1940s shape.

From 24 September 1982 to 4 June 1984 it was the northern operational terminus of the Bakerloo line.

Connections
London Buses routes 18, 112, 440 and night route N18 serve the station front.

Local attractions
Ace Cafe London

References

External links

Bakerloo line stations
Tube stations in the London Borough of Brent
DfT Category D stations
Railway stations in the London Borough of Brent
Former London and North Western Railway stations
Railway stations in Great Britain opened in 1912
Railway stations in Great Britain closed in 1917
Railway stations in Great Britain opened in 1917
Railway stations served by London Overground
1912 establishments in England